Meaux is an unincorporated community in Vermilion Parish, Louisiana, United States of America.  It is home to many types of farming, including rice, sugarcane, and soybean.  Crawfish ponds replace rice fields from February to June.

Meaux Elementary School is located at the intersection of LA 343 and LA 696.

References

Unincorporated communities in Vermilion Parish, Louisiana
Unincorporated communities in Louisiana